Thinkin Out Loud is an extended play (EP) by American singer Kristinia DeBarge, that was released via digital distribution on January 7, 2016 through Krissy D Entertainment and Beatstreet Inc.

DJ Inferno premiered "Problem" on KPWR on November 23, 2015.  "Problem" premiered exclusively on Rap-Up on January 11, 2016.

Track listing

Release history

References

Kristinia DeBarge albums
2016 debut EPs
Self-released EPs
EPs by American artists